Fathabad-e Deh-e Arab (also Romanized as Fatḩābād-e Deh-e ‘Arab; also known as ‘Arab, ‘Arab Fatḩābād, and Fatḩābād-e ‘Arab) is a village in Jaydasht Rural District, in the Central District of Firuzabad County, Fars Province, Iran. At the 2006 census, its population was 290, in 72 families.

References 

Populated places in Firuzabad County